Lejota ruficornis is a species of syrphid fly in the family Syrphidae.

Distribution
Sweden.

References

Eristalinae
Insects described in 1843
Diptera of Europe